Monsoon is a series of colour photographs taken by New Zealand photographer Brian Brake, a member of the Magnum Photos cooperative. Brake illustrated the effect of the monsoon by concentrating on the people affected by it.

Taken in India in 1960 during the monsoon season, the photos made Brake's reputation. Life published twenty of the 110 images he took, including the most famous, Monsoon Girl of the actress Aparna Sen, which appeared on the cover of Life. Several other magazines also published them, including Paris Match and Queen.

External links
 Monsoon series (online, Te Papa)
 Monsoon Girl (image online, Te Papa)

1960 in art
1960 in India
1960s photographs
Color photographs
Works about India
Works originally published in Life (magazine)